Scirites is a genus of North American sheet weavers that was first described by S. C. Bishop & C. R. Crosby in 1938.  it contains only two species: S. finitimus and S. pectinatus.

See also
 List of Linyphiidae species (Q–Z)

References

Araneomorphae genera
Linyphiidae
Spiders of North America